Pavel Pavlovich Latushko (born 10 February 1973) is a Belarusian politician and diplomat. He was the Minister of Culture of the Republic of Belarus from 2009 to 2012. In March 2023, a Belarusian court sentenced him in absentia to 18 years' imprisonment.

Biography

Education 
Latushko graduated from the law faculty of the Belarusian State University in 1995, and Minsk State Linguistic University in 1996.

Career 
From 1995 to 1996, he was the attaché of the contractual and legal department of the Ministry of Foreign Affairs of the Republic of Belarus. He then served from 1996 to 2000 as the Vice Consul, Consul of the Consulate General of the Republic of Belarus in Bialystok (Poland). Following that, he was the head of the information department and press secretary of the Belarusian Foreign Ministry from 2000 to 2002.

From 6 December 2002 to 31 October 2008, he was Ambassador Extraordinary and Plenipotentiary of the Republic of Belarus to the Republic of Poland. He then served as the Minister of Culture of the Republic of Belarus from 4 June 2009 to 16 November 2012. Since 16 November 2012, he served as Ambassador Extraordinary and Plenipotentiary of the Republic of Belarus to the French Republic, Permanent Representative of the Republic of Belarus to UNESCO. On 20 May 2013 he was appointed concurrently Ambassador Extraordinary and Plenipotentiary of the Republic of Belarus to the Kingdom of Spain and to the Portuguese Republic. On 15 January 2019, he was relieved of his post as ambassador.

In March 2019, he was appointed director of the Yanka Kupala National Academic Theater.

2020 election protests
During the 2020 Belarusian protests, he supported the strike of the theater artists, and spoke in favor of the resignation of Yury Karaev and Lidia Yermoshina. Because of his support, Latushko was fired on 17 August. Theatre artists applied en masse for the resignation in support of Pavel Latushko.

On 19 August, Latushko became a member of the presidium of Sviatlana Tsikhanouskaya's Coordination Council.

On 20 August, Alexander Konyuk, the Prosecutor-General of Belarus, initiated criminal proceedings against the members of the Coordination Council under Article 361 of the Belarusian Criminal Code, on the grounds of attempting to seize state power and harming national security.

In the closing days of August, Latushko moved to Poland after being questioned by authorities. "His departure came a day after Lukashenko warned that Latushko had crossed a red line and would face prosecution."

In late October 2020, Latushko became the head of National Anti-Crisis Management, a shadow government created by the Belarusian Coordination Council for the peaceful transition of power following the 2020 Belarusian presidential election.

On 9 August 2022, Sviatlana Tsikhanouskaya declared at a conference held in Vilnius, Lithuania, the declaration of the United Transitional Cabinet. Latushko is the responsible person for the transition of power in it.

In March 2023, a Belarusian court sentenced him in absentia to 18 years' imprisonment.

Ranks and classes 
 Ambassador Extraordinary and Plenipotentiary of the 2nd class (6 December 2002).
 First class civil servant (4 June 2009).
 Ambassador Extraordinary and Plenipotentiary (16 November 2012).

Personal life 
In addition to Russian and Belarusian, he speaks English and Polish. His ex-wife Natalia is the wife of the Belarusian diplomat and statesman Maxim Ryzhenkov.

References 

1973 births
Living people
Diplomats from Minsk
Belarusian State University alumni
Ambassadors of Belarus to France
Ambassadors of Belarus to Spain
Ambassadors of Belarus to Portugal
Ambassadors of Belarus to Poland
Permanent Delegates of Belarus to UNESCO
Fugitives
Fugitives wanted by Russia
People convicted in absentia